Weslaco Independent School District is a school district headquartered in Weslaco, Texas (USA).

WISD serves the city of Weslaco, a western portion of the city of Mercedes, and several unincorporated communities in Hidalgo County. This includes much of Midway South (sections east of South Midway Road), a portion of Midway North, Villa Verde, Olivarez, Llano Grande, and the WISD part of Mila Doce.

Schools

Choice High Schools (10-12)
South Palm Gardens High School 
Weslaco Alternative School

High Schools (Grades 9-12)
Weslaco High School  
Weslaco East High School

Middle Schools (Grades 6-8)
Central Middle School
Dr. Armando Cuellar Middle School
Beatriz G. Garza Middle School
Mary Hoge Middle School

Elementary Schools (Grades PK-5)
Airport Drive Elementary School
Louise Black Elementary School
Cleckler-Heald Elementary School
Raul A. Gonzalez, Jr. Elementary School
Sam Houston Elementary School
Dr. R. E. Margo Elementary School
Memorial Elementary School
North Bridge Elementary School
A. N. "Tony" Rico Elementary School
Rodolfo "Rudy" Silva, Jr. Elementary School

References

External links
 
 Weslaco Softball Baseball
 Weslaco Sports!

School districts in Hidalgo County, Texas